The 2010–11 season was Annan Athletic's third consecutive season in the Scottish Third Division, having been admitted to the Scottish Football League at the start of the 2008–09 season. Annan also competed in the Challenge Cup, League Cup and the Scottish Cup.

Summary
Annan finished fourth in the Third Division, entering the play-offs losing 4-3 to Albion Rovers on aggregate in the final. They reached the first round of the Challenge Cup, the first round of the League Cup and the third round of the Scottish Cup.

Results and fixtures

Scottish Third Division

Second Division play-offs

Scottish Challenge Cup

Scottish League Cup

Scottish Cup

Player statistics

Squad 

|}
a.  Includes other competitive competitions, including playoffs and the Scottish Challenge Cup.

League table

See also
List of Annan Athletic F.C. seasons

References

Annan Athletic
Annan Athletic F.C. seasons